TAKRAF Group (“TAKRAF”), is a global German industrial company. Through its brands, TAKRAF and DELKOR, the Group provides equipment, systems and services to the mining and associated industries.

Foundation and History
While the official foundation date of TAKRAF Group is given as 1948, its origins stretch back to 1725 when the Lauchhammer works for fabricating construction equipment were established, in then Prussia, together with the first blast furnace for producing iron.

1809 saw the start of activities as a mechanical engineering company, as well as major milestones being contributed to Germany’s industrial history. These included, in 1874, the Lauchhammer works commencing high-rise - and iron bridge construction in Oberhammer, and the start of fabrication of overburden and lignite mining equipment.

The Lauchhammer works continued to contribute important firsts into the 20th century. The first overburden conveyor bridge was supplied in 1924, followed, two years later, in 1926, by fabrication of the first three bucket-wheel excavators.

The years following the foundation of TAKRAF, then known as ABUS, in 1948 saw supply of the first 60 meter moveable overburden conveyor bridge for the Welzon Sued lignite mine in 1973. This was followed by the construction of four other similar conveyor bridges prior to 1991, when the world’s largest bridge complex, the 60 m overburden conveyor bridge in the Klettwitz-Nord opencast mine was commissioned. The bridge (Visitor Mine “F 60 Lichterfeld”) is open for visitors at the Internationale Bauausstellung Fürst-Pückler-Land (International Mining Exhibition Fürst-Pückler-Land).

In 1990, the 500th bucket-wheel excavator was supplied. Large scale equipment developed for on-off heap leach technology for copper ore in 1994. In 1998, large, customized gearboxes for bucket-wheel drive gearboxes were developed while, in 2000, the longest conveyor for its time was supplied. In 2006, the first TAKRAF mobile conveyor bridges for stacking and reclaiming were developed and supplied.

Renamed as TAKRAF GmbH in 2006, it was, 1 year later, acquired by the international Techint Group, operating within Tenova SpA under the brand name Tenova TAKRAF. 

Following a rebranding in 2020, simply calling itself TAKRAF Group, the entity is headquartered in Leipzig, Germany and has several representations worldwide.

See also
 Overburden Conveyor Bridge F60 
 Lauchhammer works

References

External links
 TAKRAF Group website
 TAKRAF Group YouTube channel 
 TAKRAF Group LinkedIn page 
 TAKRAF Group Twitter page 

Manufacturing companies established in 1958
1958 establishments in East Germany
Companies of East Germany
MAN SE
Mining equipment companies